This is a list of war metal bands. War metal (also known as war black metal or bestial black metal) is an aggressive, cacophonous and chaotic subgenre of blackened death metal.

List of bands

 Archgoat
 Axis of Perdition
 Bahimiron
 Beherit
 Bestial Warlust 
 Blasphemy
 Deströyer 666
 Diocletian
 Holocausto
 Impiety 
 In Battle
 Nuclear Blaze
 Revenge
 Sadistik Exekution
 Sodom
 Zyklon-B

References

Lists of death metal bands